Progressive Democratic Party (PDP) was a Spanish conservative political party, founded in 1978. The main leader of the PDP was Alfonso Osorio, who was elected as MP in the elections of 1979.

History
The party was a member of the Democratic Coalition, led by Manuel Fraga Iribarne.

On 13 September 1979 Osorio resigned as the party president, being replaced by Gabriel Camuñas Solís. The party joined People's Alliance on 30 June 1980.

Electoral performance

Cortes Generales

References

Conservative parties in Spain
1978 establishments in Spain
1980 disestablishments in Spain
Political parties established in 1978
Political parties disestablished in 1980